The Middle Atlantic Conferences (MAC) is an umbrella organization of three athletic conferences that competes in the NCAA's Division III. The 18 member colleges are in the Mid-Atlantic United States.

The organization is divided into two main conferences: the MAC Commonwealth and the MAC Freedom. A third conference, named the Middle Atlantic Conference (singular), draws members from both the Commonwealth and Freedom conferences and sponsors sports that only a certain set of members participate in, such as track & field and cross country.

History
In 1912, the Middle Atlantic States Collegiate Athletics Association (MASCAA) was founded primarily as a track association and had its first event, a track meet, at Lafayette College in May 1913. In 1922, it was reorganized as the Middle Atlantic States Collegiate Athletic Conference (MASCAC or MAC). The original 13 members present at the formation meeting in 1922 were: Bucknell University, Drexel University, Franklin & Marshall College, Gettysburg College, Haverford College, Muhlenberg College, New York University, Princeton University, Rutgers University, Stevens Institute of Technology, Susquehanna University, Swarthmore College, and the University of Delaware. In addition, another five members who were not present at the initial meeting but formally approved of the plan were: Columbia University, Johns Hopkins University, Lehigh University, Ursinus College, and Widener University.

Throughout its history, the organization has had at least 50 different members associated with it. The conference had as many as 37 members at one time in the late 1950s. A major reduction in the league occurred in 1974 after the NCAA created Divisions I, II, and III. At that time, 11 members left to form the Division I East Coast Conference and by 1976, the MAC became fully associated with Division III. An additional 11 members left in 1992 to form the Centennial Conference; the football programs for eight of those schools had already left in 1981. In 1999, the current corporation formed with its three conferences: MAC Commonwealth, MAC Freedom, and Middle Atlantic.

Arcadia University and Manhattanville College joined MAC Freedom for 2007–08. They replaced Juniata College, Drew University, Moravian College, Susquehanna University, and the University of Scranton, who left to join the new Landmark Conference. To offset the change in numbers, it was also decided to switch Lycoming College from the MAC Freedom to the MAC Commonwealth.

Alvernia University, Misericordia University, and Eastern University, all from the Pennsylvania Athletic Conference, accepted membership in the MAC Freedom and started participation in the 2008–09 school year. Starting in the 2009–10 school year, Alvernia switched from the MAC Freedom to the MAC Commonwealth, thereby giving the Commonwealth and Freedom leagues the same number of members.

Stevenson University and Hood College accepted invitations to join the MAC and MAC Commonwealth starting with the 2012–13, expanding the conference to 18 members. Elizabethtown College moved to the Landmark Conference for 2014–15.  In May 2018, Manhattanville College announced that they would leave the MAC Freedom Conference and return to the Skyline Conference for the 2019–20 academic year.  Manhattanville was a charter member of the Skyline before leaving to join the MAC in 2007. Three months later, the MAC announced that Stevens Institute of Technology, which had left the conference in 1978, would return in 2019–20 and replace Manhattanville in the MAC Freedom. In April 2019, the MAC announced that York College of Pennsylvania would join the MAC Commonwealth in 2020–21.

In May 2019, the MAC announced it would realign the Commonwealth and Freedom conferences into two equally-sized leagues effective with York's arrival in 2020. At that time, Arcadia and Lycoming moved from the MAC Commonwealth to the MAC Freedom, while Eastern made the opposite move.

In February 2022, the Landmark Conference announced that Wilkes University and Lycoming College accepted invitations to the conference starting in the 2023-24 season.

MAC football
In 1958, the MAC began sponsoring football. The football conference essentially operated as two separate conferences with the larger schools (Delaware, Temple, Lafayette, Lehigh, Bucknell, Gettysburg, and Rutgers) playing a round-robin schedule, and the smaller schools (Juniata, Lycoming, Wilkes, Widener, and Albright) playing a separate round-robin schedule. Although the upper division of the conference (which also included Muhlenberg, Drexel, La Salle, and Saint Joseph's) competed at the Division I (then known as the University Division) level in other sports, only Rutgers was considered a University Division football school. Following the 1969 season, the upper level of MAC football was disbanded as Temple dropped out to upgrade their football schedule. Rutgers had previously dropped out of the MAC for all sports and a five-team football league was not desirable. The lower division continued as MAC football, but Delaware, Lafayette, Lehigh, Gettysburg, and Bucknell operated as football independents for the rest of their tenure with the league. Numerous other MAC schools competed in other football leagues throughout most of the league's history.

In 1983, the Centennial Football League was formed by eight MAC members. Eventually, those eight schools and two others broke apart from the MAC for all sports, founding the Centennial Conference in 1991. Since then, all league members that sponsor football have competed in the MAC Football Conference.

Member schools

MAC Commonwealth

Notes

MAC Freedom

Notes

Former members

Sports

Member teams currently compete in 27 sports, 14 men's and 13 women's. The most recently added sports are men's and women's ice hockey and men's volleyball, all added for 2017–18. The MAC now sponsors all NCAA Division III sports except women's rowing.

Middle Atlantic Conference
The Middle Atlantic Conference combines schools from both the MAC Commonwealth and MAC Freedom and is currently used for cross country, football, women's golf, ice hockey, track & field (indoor / outdoor), swimming, men's volleyball, and wrestling. While the MAC officially sponsors ice hockey for both men and women, it does not conduct a conference tournament. All MAC ice hockey schools are also members of the United Collegiate Hockey Conference and compete for that conference's automatic bids to the D-III men's and women's tournaments. The MAC uses the regular-season results of UCHC games involving two MAC members to extrapolate a MAC champion (the same model used by the Ivy League, which has a similar relationship with ECAC Hockey).

Men's Sports

Women's Sports

Current MAC Champions

References

External links